Danilo "Dan" Rashovich (Danilo Rašović / Данило Рашовић) (born November 30, 1960 in Toronto, Ontario) is a former linebacker who played sixteen seasons in the Canadian Football League, mainly for the Saskatchewan Roughriders.

References 

1960 births
Canadian football people from Toronto
Canadian football linebackers
Players of Canadian football from Ontario
Simon Fraser University alumni
Ottawa Rough Riders players
Toronto Argonauts players
Saskatchewan Roughriders players
Simon Fraser Clan football players
Living people